The Kid Ranger is a 1936 American Western film starring Bob Steele. It was done for Supreme Pictures and was produced by A. W. Hackel.

Cast
 Bob Steele as Ray Burton
 William Farnum as Bill Mason
 Joan Barclay as Mary Brokaw
 Earl Dwire as Steve Brent

References

External links

The Kid Ranger at Letterbox DVD

1936 films
1936 Western (genre) films
American Western (genre) films
Films directed by Robert N. Bradbury
1930s American films